607 may refer to:

607, the year.
Peugeot 607, the car
Area code 607